Marietta Judah (1812–1883) was an American stage actress.  She was a successful actress in the American South and New York during the 1830s and 1840s and became famous in California of the Old West from 1851, where she became one of the pioneer actors and known as "San Francisco's Favorite Actress" and "Grand Old Woman of the Western Stage".

References

1812 births
1883 deaths
19th-century American actresses
American stage actresses
People of the American Old West
Place of birth missing
Place of death missing